SeaWorld Orlando is a  theme park and marine zoological park, in Orlando, Florida. It is owned and operated by SeaWorld Parks & Entertainment. When combined with its neighbors Discovery Cove and Aquatica, it forms SeaWorld Parks and Resorts Orlando, an entertainment complex consisting of the three parks and many hotels. In 2018, SeaWorld Orlando hosted an estimated 4.594 million guests, ranking it the 10th most visited amusement park in the United States.

History
SeaWorld Orlando opened on December 15, 1973 as the third park of the SeaWorld chain and just 2 years after Walt Disney World Resort's Magic Kingdom. This made Central Florida a multi-park vacation destination. SeaWorld was sold in 1976 to Harcourt Brace Jovanovich then to Anheuser-Busch, owners of Busch Gardens, in 1989.

Busch was more experienced with theme parks thus developed SeaWorld in a competitive and aggressive manner, moving the park from a show-based to a ride-based park. The park joined in the Disneyland-started simulator ride wave in 1992 with Mission: Bermuda Triangle (later rethemed into Wild Arctic). The nation's first combination roller coaster and flume ride, Journey to Atlantis, was installed in 1998. In 2000, the Kraken, a Bolliger & Mabillard floorless roller coaster, was added to the park. The flying coaster, Manta, came to the park in 2009 and won Theme Park Insider Award as the best new attraction.

SeaWorld Orlando contains two sister parks. Discovery Cove opened in 2000 followed by water park Aquatica in 2008. The 2008 purchase of Anheuser-Busch by Belgian brewer InBev led to the sale of Busch's parks to a private equity firm in 2009. The sale also led to the closure of the park's Hospitality Center on February 1, 2009.

On February 24, 2010, during a small show at "Dine with Shamu", one of the orca whales, Tilikum, pulled trainer Dawn Brancheau into the water and ultimately killed her. An autopsy determined that Brancheau's death was attributed to blunt force trauma and drowning; injuries included her scalp being removed and her left arm being severed below the shoulder. In August 2010, the United States Department of Labor's Occupational Safety and Health Administration cited SeaWorld of Florida LLC for three safety violations, following the death of an animal trainer in February. The total penalty was $75,000 and SeaWorld was initially required to keep a barrier between its trainers and the whales during shows.

Its Turtle Trek exhibit opened in 2012 includes a 360-degree, 3D dome theater for a movie. In 2013, its Antarctica: Empire of the Penguin pavilion had the nation's first trackless dark ride system.

In 2013, Antarctica, Empire of the Penguin (or Sea of Ice) section opened to replace the Penguin Encounter. It contains a trackless family ride (which closed in 2020), plus an improved penguin exhibit.

Mako, a B&M hypercoaster opened in 2016 in the Sea of Power near the Shark Encounter.

On March 27, 2019, the park reopened the Sea of Fun area as "Sesame Street Land", themed after Sesame Street.

On June 1, 2019, a new roller coaster (later revealed as Ice Breaker) was announced through a teaser video released by SeaWorld Orlando. It opened on February 18, 2022.

In mid-March 2020, in line with other SeaWorld parks, as a result of the ongoing COVID-19 pandemic, the park had to temporarily shut down. The park reopened nearly three months later.

Park layout

In summer 2014, as a part of the company's 50th anniversary, SeaWorld Orlando was separated into different areas, called "seas". Each with a unique themed element. Starting at the lower center and continuing clockwise they are:

  Port of Entry: The main entrance of the park features a Florida-inspired theme with tropical landscaping and a large artificial freshwater marina with a Shamu-themed iconic lighthouse.
 Sea of Shallows: This area showcases most of the shallow water sea animal exhibits at the park as well as the Dolphin Theater. In addition, the Manta rollercoaster travels through this section and Turtle Trek, A 360 degree dome film, featuring the story of a turtle. All of the Key West at SeaWorld area is inside of the Sea of Shallows. It is designed to mimic the appearance of the city of Key West, Florida with architecture and landscaping reminiscent of the area. Animal exhibits in this portion of the park include lesser devil rays, cownose rays, southern stingrays, green sea turtles, hawksbill sea turtle, loggerhead sea turtle, Atlantic bottlenose dolphins, greater flamingos, West Indian manatees, American alligators and brown pelicans. The stingray and dolphin habitats offer opportunities for guests to feed the animals.
 Sea of Legends: Journey to Atlantis, a boat ride with roller coaster elements, bases its story from the legend of the lost city of Atlantis. Also found here is Kraken, a floorless roller coaster.
 Sea of Ice: Sea of Ice, originally named Antarctica, is themed around the Antarctic continent. Antarctica: Empire of the Penguin is the sole attraction in this area as a penguin exhibit.
 Sea of Delight: Sea of Delight includes a sub-area named The Waterfront, which resembles a seaside Mediterranean village. The park's Sky Tower ride is also here, it was integrated into the theme of The Waterfront village when the area opened in 2003. The only land animal show at the park, Pets Ahoy, is located here inside of the Seaport Theater. Outside of the Waterfront is where the Sea Lion and Otter Stadium viewing area stands. 
 Sea of Mystery: The Sea of Mystery houses the Shark Encounter exhibit and the Shark's Underwater Grill, as well as the Nautilus Theater, which is currently used for seasonal shows and events. Mako, a Bolliger & Mabillard steel hypercoaster opened in the area on June 10, 2016, The current shark exhibit and the surrounding area has been renovated to become Shark Wreck Reef. As of 2018 this area also became home to the rapids ride Infinity Falls set in the sub area of sea of Infinity which is a rainforest area also featuring a food location, waterway grill.
 Sea of Power: Sea of Power is host area of the SeaWorld's killer whale shows. The Shamu Stadium is located in the center with the Wild Arctic indoor pavilion next-door. Wild Arctic is an indoor animal exhibit hosting beluga whales, Pacific walrus, harbor seals and formerly polar bears. Shamu Stadium currently hosts "Orca Encounter" as its main show with "Shamu Celebration: Light up the Night" and "Shamu Christmas Miracles" showing seasonally.
 Sesame Street Land: Formerly Shamu's Happy Harbor and Sea of Fun, Sesame Street Land is a children's area located adjacent to Shamu Stadium and features family activities including Super Grover's Box Car Derby (a junior rollercoaster) and a water play area. It is the only area within SeaWorld Orlando to be based on the educational television program, Sesame Street.

Attractions

SeaWorld Orlando has many live shows and attractions including rides and animal exhibits. Many of these attractions, such as Manta combine the two, with both animal exhibits and a ride.

Rides and attractions

Live entertainment and animal presentations

Attendance

Aquatica Orlando

SeaWorld Orlando has a nearby sister park named Aquatica Orlando, which opened in 2008, part of the greater chain of Aquatica water parks.

See also
 Incidents at SeaWorld Orlando

Notes

External links

Aquatica Website

 
1973 establishments in Florida
Amusement parks in Orlando, Florida
Amusement parks opened in 1973
Aquaria in Florida
Oceanaria in the United States
SeaWorld Parks & Entertainment
Tourist attractions in Orlando, Florida
Zoos established in 1973
Zoos in Florida